Constantion Bădescu (July 16, 1892, Mihăești, Vâlcea County – September 10, 1962, Bucharest) was a Romanian brigadier-general during World War II.  

Bădescu was born in Mihăești, Vâlcea County in 1892.

He served as commanding officer, 1st Dorobanți Infantry Regiment in 1941, but was called into reserve the following year.  He retired in 1943, but was recalled in 1944 and served as commanding officer, 11th Brigade.  In 1945, he first served as general officer commanding the 11th Division (12 January–18 February), then commanding officer 11th Brigade, and finally general officer commanding 11th Division again (13 March–12 May).

He retired in 1947, and died in Bucharest in 1962.

Awards
 Order of the Star of Romania, Officer rank (8 June 1940)
 Order of Michael the Brave, 3rd class (4 August 1945)

References

External links
 

1892 births
1962 deaths
Romanian Land Forces generals
Romanian military personnel of World War II
People from Vâlcea County
Recipients of the Order of Michael the Brave
Officers of the Order of the Star of Romania